Fritz Geyer (born 28 June 1925) was a German diver. He competed in the men's 10 metre platform event at the 1952 Summer Olympics.

References

External links
 
 

1925 births
Possibly living people
German male divers
Olympic divers of Germany
Divers at the 1952 Summer Olympics